Fada Cola is a locally distributed cola soft drink produced in Marseille. The name fada is the Marseille version of the French word "fou", meaning "mad".

The catchphrase of the company is: Qui ne boit pas Fada ne vient pas de marseille! meaning If you don't drink Fada you're not from Marseille. It is thus playing on the local factor, which is a very good selling point since every Marseillais is extremely proud of his hometown, and as a  result, currently, the company is selling 1 Million units per week.

External links 
 Official website

Cola brands
Marseille